Verkhnyaya Baygora is a rural locality (a selo) in Nizhnebaygorskoye Rural Settlement, Verkhnekhavsky District, Voronezh Oblast, Russia. The population was 396 as of 2010. There are 10 streets.

Geography 
Verkhnyaya Baygora is located 15 km north of Verkhnyaya Khava (the district's administrative centre) by road. Nizhnyaya Baygora is the nearest rural locality.

References 

Rural localities in Verkhnekhavsky District